Peter Colfs (1906 – 1983) was a Belgian painter. His work was part of the painting event in the art competition at the 1932 Summer Olympics. A tapestry that he designed called Triumph of Peace was gifted to the United Nations in 1954.

References

1906 births
1983 deaths
20th-century Belgian painters
Olympic competitors in art competitions
Artists from Antwerp